Coiled-coil domain containing 88C is a protein that in humans is encoded by the CCDC88C gene.

Function
This gene encodes a ubiquitously expressed coiled-coil domain-containing protein that interacts with the dishevelled protein and is a negative regulator of the Wnt signalling pathway. The protein encoded by this gene has a PDZ domain binding motif in its C-terminus, with which it interacts with the dishevelled protein. Dishevelled is a scaffold protein involved in the regulation of the Wnt signaling pathway.

The Wnt signaling pathway plays an important role in embryonic development, tissue, and cancer progression. Mutations in this gene cause autosomal recessive, primary non-syndromic congenital hydrocephalus, a condition characterized by excessive accumulation of cerebrospinal fluid in the ventricles of the brain (provided by RefSeq, Jan 2013).

References

Further reading